Michele Danese (born 11 September 1982) is an Italian motorcycle racer.

Career statistics

Grand Prix motorcycle racing

By season

Races by year
(key) (Races in bold indicate pole position)

References

External links
 Profile on MotoGP.com

1982 births
Living people
Sportspeople from the Province of Vicenza
Italian motorcycle racers
125cc World Championship riders
250cc World Championship riders